Shalom is the Hebrew word for hello, goodbye, and peace, and is a Hebrew given name.

Shalom, Sholom, or Sholem may also refer to:

Media
Shalom (film), a 1973 film by director Yaky Yosha
 Shalom (TV channel), an Indian religious channel
 Shalom TV, an American Jewish television channel
Şalom, a Jewish weekly newspaper published in Istanbul, Turkey
Shalom, the season premiere of NCIS (season 4)
Shabbat Shalom (NCIS), a season 10 episode of NCIS
 Shalom (album), an album by The Rabbis' Sons
 Shalom (band), a 1990s Czech synth-pop band
 Shalom in the Home, an American reality tv show on TLC in 2006-07

People

As a surname
Silvan Shalom (born 1958), Israeli politician
Judy Shalom Nir-Mozes (born 1958), Israeli heiress and talk-show host, wife of Silvan Shalom
Stephen Shalom, American professor

As a given name
Sholem Aleichem (1859–1916), Yiddish author
Sholem Asch (1880–1957), Yiddish author
Shalom Auslander (born 1970), American author
Shalom Carmy (born 1948), American rabbi and scholar
Yosef Shalom Eliashiv (1910–2012), Israeli rabbi and posek
Shalom Hanoch (born 1946), Israeli rock musician
Shalom Harlow (born 1973), Canadian model and actress
Shalom Luani (born 1994), American football player
Sholom Schwadron (1912–1997), Israeli rabbi known as the "Maggid of Jerusalem"
Sholom Mordechai Schwadron (1835–1911), Ukrainian rabbi and posek known as the Maharsham
Sholom Schwartzbard (1886–1938), Bessarabian poet, assassin of Symon Petliura
Shalom Shachna (died 1558), rabbi and Talmudist
 Shalom Charly "Papi" Turgeman (born 1970), Israeli basketball player

Organizations
Brit Tzedek v'Shalom
Brit Shalom (political organization)
Gush Shalom
Hevel Shalom
Neve Shalom
Shalom Sesame
Neve Shalom Synagogue in İstanbul, Turkey
Shalom Park in Charlotte, North Carolina and Denver, Colorado
Shalom Meir Tower in Tel Aviv
Shalom International School in Port Harcourt, Rivers State
Valley Beth Shalom in Encino, California
Shalom, a shipping company based in Peru

Space
SHALOM (satellite), a join satellite mission between the Israeli Space Agency and the Italian Space Agency

Other uses
SS Shalom, an ocean liner operated by Zim Lines, Israel 1964–1967

See also
Beth Shalom (disambiguation)
Jewish greetings
Salaam (disambiguation)
Scholem
Shalom aleichem (disambiguation)
Salome (disambiguation)
Salam (disambiguation)
Salma (disambiguation)